Senator Cushman may refer to:

Henry W. Cushman (1805–1863), Massachusetts State Senate
Joshua Cushman (1761–1834), Massachusetts State Senate